Iraq–Syria relations are the bilateral relations/diplomatic relations between the Sovereign states of Iraq and Syria. Since both nations are neighbours, they share the Iraq–Syria border. Relations are marked by long-shared cultural and political links, as well as former regional rivalry. The two countries took their present form after the Sykes–Picot Agreement to dismember the Ottoman Empire into British and French spheres of influence after World War I.

Both countries are largely Arab and Muslim, with Kurdish, Assyrians Chaldeans Syriacs, Arab Christians and Syrian Turkmen and Iraqi Turkmen minorities. Political relations between them have often been hostile. Ever since King Faisal took the Iraqi throne in the early 1920s, Iraqi leaders have dreamed of unifying the two countries. Even during the thaw in Iraqi-Syrian relations during the last years of Saddam Hussein, relations between the two countries were not good. New diplomatic relations established in November 2006, were heralded as the beginning of an era of close cooperation between Iraq and Syria.

Both countries fought against the Islamic State of Iraq and the Levant (ISIL). In the Syrian Civil War, Iraqi volunteers have been fighting in Syria alongside the Syrian Army. The two countries are part of the Russia–Syria–Iran–Iraq coalition which was formed as a consequence of an agreement reached at the end of September 2015 between Russia, Iran, Iraq and Syria to "help and cooperate in collecting information about ISIL to combat the advances of the group, according to the statement issued by the Iraqi Joint Operations Command. From 2017 to 2019, Iraq joined the Syrian Civil War on behalf of the Syrian government and helped eliminate the Islamic State of Iraq and the Levant within the country.

Country Comparisons

Medieval period 
In the ninth and tenth centuries, the Hamdanid emirate of Syria and Jazira broke off with the Abbasid Caliphate based in Iraq. The Hamdanids occupied parts of Abbasid Iraq in 942, before being expelled by the Buyids of Iran. 

The Seljuks moved into Iraq and Syria during the eleventh century. Abbasid Iraq regained independence and the caliph was recognized as the spiritual leader of Sunni Islam by the Seljuks, including the Seljuks of Syria. In the 12th century, the Zengids took power in Syria and intervened in the war between Abbasid Iraq and the Seljuks. Saladin of the Ayyubid dynasty was later declared the Sultan of Egypt and Sultan of Syria; he aligned Syria to the Abbasids in Iraq.

Ba'athist Iraq and Syria

Efforts by Syrians and Iraqis to unite Iraq and Syria into one country have existed since the creation of the modern states. Such unification efforts were to continue under the Ba'ath Party. Hostility between Syria and Iraq started in the 1966 when both were under Ba'athist rule. Relations improved in the early 1970s during the Yom Kippur War, but deteroriated again following Syria's acceptance of the UN-sponsored ceasefire.

After the 1973 War, Syrian President Hafez al-Assad made several attempts in 1974 and 1975 to settle his differences with Iraq (arising from Syria's acceptance of UN Resolution 338 which led to the ceasefire in the 1973 War; Iraq withdrew the expeditionary force it had sent to help Syria as a result of Syria's acceptance of the ceasefire) and establish a union between the two countries. Iraq however rejected Assad's offers and denounced him for his "readiness to make peace" with Israel. Strained relations between Iraq and Syria would continue up until 1978.

By October 1978, Iraq President, Ahmed Hassan al-Bakr began working closely with Assad to foil the Camp David Accords; signing in Baghdad a charter for Joint National Action which provided for the "closest form of unity ties" including "complete military unity" as well as "economic, political and cultural unification".

In 1978 Iraqi President Ahmed Hassan al-Bakr and Hafez al-Assad, had agreed to a plan and started to make treaties that would lead to the unification of Iraq and Syria. This plan was to come into effect in July 1979. However, Saddam Hussein, the Deputy Secretary of the Iraqi Ba'ath Party, fearful of losing his power to Assad (who was supposed to become the deputy leader in the new union), forced al-Bakr into retirement under threat of violence.

Unity talks did continue between Assad and Saddam after July 1979, but Assad rejected Iraqi demands for a full merger between the two states and for the immediate deployment of Iraq troops into Syria. Instead Assad, perhaps fearful of Iraqi domination and a new war with Israel, advocated a step-by-step approach. The unity talks were eventually suspended indefinitely after an alleged discovery of a Syrian plot to overthrow Saddam Hussein in November 1979.

Shortly after coming to power Saddam claimed to have been informed of a plot against him, supported by the Syrians, and suspended, then later abandoned the plan for unification. In November 1979 both countries officially suspended relations with one another and withdrew their diplomatic missions. Prior to his forced retirement Bakr had expressed to Assad a desire to speed up the process of union, as he feared elements within the Iraqi Ba'ath Party were trying to kill the union plan. However the Iran–Iraq War and Assad's growing closeness with Iran effectively ended any hopes of rapprochement, and in January 1982 the borders between the two countries were closed and sealed and all trade and movement of citizens was stopped.

Later, Syria joined the coalition that liberated Kuwait from Iraqi occupation in the 1991 Gulf War. Up until the renewal of diplomatic ties in 2006, Iraqi leaders often accused Syria of trying to destabilize their country by allowing Sunni Arab foreign fighters to cross back and forth over the border between the two countries.

Relations with Syria have been marred by traditional rivalry for pre-eminence in Arab affairs, allegations of involvement in each other's internal politics, and disputes over the waters of Euphrates River, oil transit fees, and stances toward Israel. Syria broke relations after Iraq invaded Kuwait in 1990 and joined other Arab states in sending military forces to the coalition that forced Iraq out of Kuwait. Relations remained cool until Bashar al-Assad became President of Syria in 2000.

Recent developments

Although the official relations between the two countries were suspended in the past, Syrian-Iraqi relations experienced developments in recent years and the reciprocal visits between the two countries have led to a number of agreements on economic cooperation including an agreement for resuming pumping of oil through the Syrian territories which was suspended in 1982.

Syria strongly opposed the U.S. invasion of Iraq in 2003, stressing the necessity to maintain the independence of Iraq and support its political process, demanding a time table for the withdrawal of the foreign troops from Iraq. Syria has also played the host for more than 2 million Iraqis, providing refuge for them.

Syria and Iraq formally ended more than twenty years of diplomatic estrangement, when Syria's foreign minister, Walid Muallem, visited Iraq in 2006, which was the first such meeting since the fall of Saddam Hussein in 2003. Ambassadors were established later in 2006. On 23 August 2009 the Iraqi government aired a taped conversation linking two members of the Syria-based Iraqi Ba'athist movement, Sattam Farhan and Mohammed Younis al-Ahmed, with the August 2009 Baghdad bombings which claimed more than 100 lives. The Syrian foreign ministry denied Syrian involvement in the attack.  On 25 August Iraq summoned its ambassador to return from Syria, the Syrian government issued a similar order to its ambassador within hours in retaliation. Responsibility for the attack was later claimed by the Islamic State of Iraq.

Syrian Civil War

Both Iraq and Syria are close allies of Iran. Iraq has maintained its embassy in Syria, while many others have closed, withdrawn their ambassadors, or temporarily relocated to Beirut. In March 2012, local lawmakers in Iraq's Dohuk province voted to open camp for refugees from Syria. Although some of Iraq's Shiite clerics refused to give support to Assad, and Muqtada al-Sadr called on the Syrian president to step down from power, Iraq remains one of the few remaining Arab countries which support the Syrian government, and has abstained from voting to expel Syria from the Arab league.

Both countries have closely cooperated with each other against ISIL, with Iraq being a part of the Russia–Syria–Iran–Iraq coalition which was formed as a consequence of an agreement reached at the end of September 2015 between Russia, Iran, Iraq and Syria to "help and cooperate in collecting information about the terrorist Daesh group (ISIL) to combat the advances of the group, according to the statement issued by the Iraqi Joint Operations Command.

Since 2016, Iraqi volunteers have been fighting alongside the SAA, and their forces have met on the Iraqi-Syrian border crossing. In February 2017, Iraq conducted its first airstrike against ISIL targets in Syria, which was performed in coordination with the Syrian government. In July 2017, Iraq, along with Iran, signed an agreement to boost military cooperation with Syria. A vital border crossing near the town of Al-Qaim that links the capitals of Iraq and Syria, was re-opened on 30 September 2019, after being seized by ISIS jihadists since 2014.

See also

 Mesopotamia

Fertile Crescent Plan
Foreign relations of Iraq
Foreign relations of Syria
Greater Syria 
Shia Crescent
Shia–Sunni relations
Syrian Social Nationalist Party (Political party seeking the union of Iraq, the Levant, Kuwait and Sinai)

References

 
Syria
Bilateral relations of Syria